Carl Held (born September 19, 1931), sometimes credited as Karl Held and Christopher Held, is an American actor who has worked extensively in both American and British television.

Career
Held is best known for his role as Garth in the 1980s soap opera Falcon Crest, which he played for three seasons from 1987 to 1989.

During the fourth season (1960–1961) of Perry Mason, Held appeared as Bruce Nesbitt in the episode "The Case of the Angry Dead Man".  Later that season, he appeared as the defendant David Gideon in "The Case of the Grumbling Grandfather."  He appeared as Gideon in eight more episodes in the fifth season (1961–1962) in a "legal eagle" aspiring law student role, assisting Perry in uncovering evidence to aid Mason's clients accused of murder.

Five months after the final space launch of Project Mercury in 1963, Held played a solo astronaut in "The Man Who Was Never Born", the sixth episode of The Outer Limits.

Other TV credits include 77 Sunset Strip, The Big Valley, The Girl from U.N.C.L.E., Flipper, The Fugitive, Daktari, Star Trek, The Invaders, Mission: Impossible, The Lotus Eaters, Space: 1999, Return of the Saint, The Aphrodite Inheritance, Thriller (1975), The Incredible Hulk, Charlie's Angels, Taxi, St. Elsewhere, MacGyver, Scarecrow and Mrs. King, Riptide, The Rebel and L.A. Law.

Filmography

Film

Television

References

External links
 

1931 births
Living people
British male television actors
American male television actors
American male soap opera actors
20th-century American male actors
People from New Jersey